Marciniszyn is a Polish surname. Notable people with the surname include:

Grzegorz Marciniszyn (born 1977), Polish long jumper
Marcin Marciniszyn (born 1982), Polish sprinter

Polish-language surnames